"Khelo Aazadi Se" was the official anthem of the 2022 Kashmir Premier League, the second season of the Kashmir Premier League. It was sung by Sahir Ali Bagga and Aima Baig, who are the official singers for the 2022 KPL. It featured cricketers Azam Khan, Kamran Akmal, Shahid Afridi, Sharjeel Khan and Shoaib Malik.

Release
The song was released via YouTube and received over 60,000 views. The 2022 KPL was promoted using the hashtag #KheloAazadiSe.

References

External links

2022 songs
Kashmir Premier League (Pakistan)